The Hotel-Dieu de Québec is a teaching hospital located in Quebec City, Quebec, Canada, and affiliated with Université Laval's medical school. It is part of the Centre hospitalier universitaire de Québec (CHUQ), a network of five teaching hospitals and several specialized institutions. Its areas of expertise include cancer treatment, kidney disease and cochlear implants. It has an affiliated research centre, the Centre de recherche de l’Hôtel-Dieu de Québec.

This hospital was the first such facility in Canada, and the first in North America, north of Mexico.

History
The hospital was officially founded in 1637 in order to meet the colony's need for healthcare by Marie-Madeleine de Vignerot, the Duchesse d'Aiguillon (1604-1675), a niece of Cardinal Richelieu. She entrusted the task to the Canonesses of St. Augustine of the Mercy of Jesus, a nun of the Hospitaller Sisters, whose spiritual vocation, was as nurses.

Three young canonesses left their monastery in Dieppe, on the coast of the English Channel, and arrived in New France on 1 August 1639 with the goal of opening the hospital. They were Mothers Marie de Saint-Ignace Guenet, Marie de Saint-Bonaventure Forestier and Anne de Saint-Bernard Le Cointre.

The canonesses established the hospital at its first site in 1640, in what was then the village of Sillery. In keeping with the wishes of the Duchess, their care was directed to the people of the First Nations. Dwellings were built near the hospital for the native people to facilitate their care. By 1644, however, they had to abandon the site due to repeated attacks by  Iroquois warriors, and the community moved to the town of Quebec.

There the canonesses acquired the site and built the hospital that still stands. Serving the French colonists after that point, it became the leading medical institution for the care of the people of the city.

A new hospital for the poor was built in 1693 by Jean-Baptiste de Saint-Vallier, the second Bishop of Quebec, known as the Hôpital-Général de Québec. Initially four canonesses were sent to help in running the hospital. The bishop formally entrusted it to the canonesses of the Hôtel-Dieu in 1698, and the Sisters who served there became an independent monastery in 1701.

The hospital was designated a National Historic Site of Canada in 1936. The Hôtel-Dieu continued to be operated by the Augustinian canonesses until 1962.

Description
The site has structures that range in date from 1695 to 2001.

The vaulted cellars that support the three-storey wings were built in 1695. Stone walls surround an adjoining Augustine cemetery, monastery, garden and cloister. Opened in 1803, the hospital chapel had its interior and façade remodelled in later years by Thomas Baillairgé.

References

Bibliography
 Emporis: Hôpital de l'Hôtel Dieu
 Profile

External links

Hôtel-Dieu de Québec

Buildings and structures completed in 1693
Hospital buildings completed in the 17th century
Hospitals in Quebec City
Monasteries of Canonesses Regular
1637 establishments in the French colonial empire
Hospitals established in the 17th century
National Historic Sites in Quebec
1693 establishments in the French colonial empire